Ahmad Chaleh Pey may refer to:
 Bala Ahmad Chaleh Pey
 Pain Ahmad Chaleh Pey